The 2007 Recopa Sul-Brasileira was the 1st staging of this Brazilian football knockout competition. All matches of the competition were played at Estádio Janguito Malucelli, Curitiba, Paraná. Four clubs participated of the competition: Caxias, of Rio Grande do Sul (champion of Copa FGF), J. Malucelli of Paraná (champion of Copa Paraná), Juventus of São Paulo (champion of Copa FPF), and Marcílio Dias of Santa Catarina (champion of Copa Santa Catarina).

Prize money
The winner of the competition was awarded a prize money amount of R$30,000, and the runner-up was awarded a prize money amount of R$10,000.

Competition stages

Semifinals

(1) Due to rains, the match start was delayed 25 minutes.

Final

Champion

Top goalscorers

References

2007 Recopa Sul-Brasileira
2007 in Brazilian football
2007 domestic association football cups